The British 3,000 metres athletics champions covers two competitions; the Amateur Athletic Club Championships (1968-1999) and the UK Athletics Championships which existed from 1977 until 1997 and ran concurrently with the AAA Championships.

Where an international athlete won the AAA Championships the highest ranking UK athlete is considered the National Champion in this list.

Past winners

 NBA = No British athlete in medal placings
 nc = not contested
 + = UK Championships

References

3,000 metres
British
British Athletics Championships